Xu Haijiao is a Chinese swimmer. He won the silver medal at the Men's 400 metre freestyle S8 event at the 2016 Summer Paralympics with 4:25.65.

References

Living people
Swimmers at the 2016 Summer Paralympics
Swimmers at the 2020 Summer Paralympics
Medalists at the 2016 Summer Paralympics
Medalists at the 2020 Summer Paralympics
Paralympic silver medalists for China
Paralympic swimmers of China
Chinese male butterfly swimmers
Chinese male breaststroke swimmers
Chinese male medley swimmers
S8-classified Paralympic swimmers
Chinese male freestyle swimmers
Year of birth missing (living people)
Paralympic medalists in swimming
21st-century Chinese people
Medalists at the 2018 Asian Para Games